Maphumulo is a town in Ilembe District Municipality in the KwaZulu-Natal province of South Africa.

Settlement some 42 km north-west of Stanger and 38 km south-east of Kranskop. Named after the Mapumulo Zulu people who came to live here after being driven out by Shaka; the name is said to mean ‘heaven of rest’. This village had a trading store (owned by J.O. Christie ) a police station, a magistrate's court, and a post office - all during the 1940s and 1950s.

References

Populated places in the Maphumulo Local Municipality